is a 1984 Japanese comedy film directed by Yoji Yamada. It stars Kiyoshi Atsumi as Torajirō Kuruma (Tora-san), and Rie Nakahara as his love interest or "Madonna". Marriage Counselor Tora-san is the thirty-third entry in the popular, long-running Otoko wa Tsurai yo series.

Synopsis
In Shibamata, Tokyo, Tora-san's family prepares for a wedding. Meanwhile, the traveling Tora-san meets an old acquaintance in Iwate Province. Tora-san refuses to drink with him, afraid that the acquaintance, now settled and married, will again become attracted to Tora-san's wandering existence. Tora-san becomes attracted to a female barber, but must break off their relationship so that she too can live a secure life. She instead gets into an abusive relationship with a motorcyclist.

Cast
 Kiyoshi Atsumi as Torajirō
 Chieko Baisho as Sakura
 Rie Nakahara as Fūko Kogure
 Tsunehiko Watase as Tony
 Jun Miho as Akemi
 Shimojo Masami as Kuruma Tatsuzō
 Chieko Misaki as Tsune Kuruma (Torajiro's aunt)
 Taisaku Akino
 Gin Maeda as Hiroshi Suwa
 Hidetaka Yoshioka as Mitsuo Suwa
 Hisao Dazai as Boss (Umetarō Katsura)
 Gajirō Satō as Genkō
 Chishū Ryū as Gozen-sama

Critical appraisal
Stuart Galbraith IV writes that Marriage Counselor Tora-san is a better entry in the Otoko wa Tsurai yo series, though it differs considerably from other films in the series, both formally and thematically. Tora-san's wandering life is portrayed harshly, rather than light-heartedly, and his family's stable life is shown in the more positive light. Galbraith concludes, "With its darker tone and atypical structure, Tora-san's Marriage Counselor is like a breath of fresh air following a series of recent, somewhat repetitive entries." The German-language site molodezhnaja gives Marriage Counselor Tora-san three and a half out of five stars.

Availability
Marriage Counselor Tora-san was released theatrically on August 4, 1984. In Japan, the film was released on videotape in 1987 and 1996, and in DVD format in 2005 and 2008.

References
Notes

Bibliography
English
 
 
 

German
 

Japanese

External links
 Marriage Counselor Tora-san at www.tora-san.jp (official site)

1984 films
Films directed by Yoji Yamada
1984 comedy films
1980s Japanese-language films
Otoko wa Tsurai yo films
Japanese sequel films
Shochiku films
Films with screenplays by Yôji Yamada
1980s Japanese films